was a village located in Ama District, Aichi Prefecture, Japan.

As of 2003, the village had an estimated population of 4,930 and a density of 404.43 persons per km². The total area was 12.19 km².

On April 1, 2005, Hachikai, along with the towns of Saya and Saori, and the village of Tatsuta (all from Ama District), was merged to create the city Aisai.

Dissolved municipalities of Aichi Prefecture
Aisai, Aichi